Lamyctes africanus is a species of centipede in the Henicopidae family. It was first described in 1871 by Swedish naturalist Carl Oscar von Porat.

Distribution
The species has been recorded from a geographically widespread suite of sites, including Africa, Europe, south-western Western Australia, Hawaii and the Juan Fernandez Islands.

Behaviour
The centipedes are solitary terrestrial predators that inhabit plant litter and soil.

References

 

 
africanus
Centipedes of Australia
Fauna of Western Australia
Arthropods of Africa
Myriapods of Europe
Animals described in 1871
Taxa named by Carl Oscar von Porat